Kurort Kiran is a rural locality (a settlement) in Kyakhtinsky District, Republic of Buryatia, Russia. The population was 145 as of 2010. There are 2 streets.

Geography 
Kurort Kiran is located 39 km southeast of Kyakhta (the district's administrative centre) by road. Dureny is the nearest rural locality.

References 

Rural localities in Kyakhtinsky District